Benjamin Swift (April 9, 1780 – November 11, 1847) was an American lawyer, banker and politician from Vermont. He served as a United States Representative and United States Senator, and helped found the Whig Party.

Early life
Swift was born in Amenia, New York, the son of Job Swift and Mary Ann (Sedgwick) Swift. In 1786, at the age of five, he moved with his father to Bennington in the Vermont Republic. He attended the common schools in Bennington before attending Litchfield Law School in 1801. He studied law and was admitted to the bar in 1806. He began the practice of law in Bennigton before moving to Manchester to practice law. In 1809 he moved to St. Albans to practice law. He also engaged in banking and farming in the area.

Political career
He held various political positions in Vermont, and was elected to the Vermont State House in 1825. He served in the State House until 1827. He was then elected to serve Vermont as a National Republican Party candidate in the United States House of Representatives. He served in the Twentieth and the Twenty-first Congresses from March 4, 1827 to March 3, 1831. While in Congress, he was on the executive committee of the Congressional Temperance Society. He declined renomination.

In 1833 he was elected as an Anti-Jacksonian candidate to the United States Senate, serving from March 4, 1833 to March 3, 1839. While in the Senate, Swift was a strong opponent of President Andrew Jackson and helped found the Whig Party. Swift was not renominated for a second term in the Senate and returned to St. Albans where he continued to work as a lawyer and farmer until his death. He died on November 11, 1847 in St. Albans, Vermont and is interred in Greenwood Cemetery in St. Albans.

Family life
Swift married Rebecca Brown on October 26, 1809. He and his wife had nine children: Charles Henry Swift, Cordelia Swift, William Swift, Catherine Sedgwick Swift, Alfred Brown Swift, Jane Harriet Swift, George Sedgwick Swift, Caroline Swift and Charles Benjamin Swift.

References

Further reading
 Smith, Worthington. A Discourse, Delivered November 17, 1847, at the Interment of the Hon. Benjamin Swift, Late a U.S. Senator from the State of Vermont. St. Albans, VT: E.B. Whiting, 1848.

External links
 
 

	

1781 births
1847 deaths
People from Amenia, New York
American people of English descent
Vermont Democratic-Republicans
National Republican Party members of the United States House of Representatives from Vermont
National Republican Party United States senators from Vermont
Vermont National Republicans
Vermont Whigs
Whig Party United States senators from Vermont
Members of the Vermont House of Representatives
American bankers
Farmers from Vermont
People from Bennington, Vermont
People from St. Albans, Vermont
Vermont lawyers
Litchfield Law School alumni
Burials in Vermont
19th-century American lawyers
Members of the United States House of Representatives from Vermont